Breaking Bad is an American television drama series created by Vince Gilligan, which premiered in 2008 on the cable network AMC. The story is about Walter White (Bryan Cranston), a 50-year-old high school chemistry teacher in Albuquerque, New Mexico. After White is diagnosed with terminal lung cancer, he uses his chemistry expertise to cook crystal meth, assisted by his former student Jesse Pinkman (Aaron Paul), to secure his family's (played by Anna Gunn and RJ Mitte) inheritance before he dies.

 The pilot episode was first aired on January 20, 2008, and the series finale, was broadcast on September 29, 2013. Breaking Bad: Original Minisodes, which consisted of several one- to five-minute clips, released 17 short episodes over the course of three years throughout Breaking Bads run. 

On October 11, 2019, Netflix released El Camino: A Breaking Bad Movie, a feature film continuation of Breaking Bad, written and directed by Gilligan. An additional short film Snow Globe: A Breaking Bad Short was released on February 17, 2020.

Series overview

Episodes

Season 1 (2008)

Season 2 (2009)

Season 3 (2010)

Season 4 (2011)

Season 5 (2012–13)

Other media

Breaking Bad: Original Minisodes (2009–2011)
Breaking Bad: Original Minisodes is a web series based on the television series Breaking Bad. A total of 17 "minisodes", which are more comedy-oriented than most full episodes, were released over the course of three years.

Season 1 (2009)
On February 17, 2009, five "mini-episodes" were made available online before the premiere of the show's second season. These five were eventually included with Breaking Bad: The Complete Second Season.

Season 2 (2010)
Before Breaking Bads third season, ten more webisodes were released, each mostly focused on Saul Goodman.

Season 3 (2011)
Additional minisodes were produced before the premiere of Breaking Bads fourth season; two would eventually be released.

Snow Globe: A Breaking Bad Short (2020)

In conjunction with the television premiere of El Camino: A Breaking Bad Movie on AMC, the network released a three-minute short film Snow Globe: A Breaking Bad Short on its official YouTube account on February 17, 2020.

Ratings

See also
 List of Better Call Saul episodes

Notes

References

External links 
 

 
Lists of American crime drama television series episodes